The Mobile River is located in southern Alabama in the United States. Its drainage basin is the fourth-largest of primary stream drainage basins entirely in the United States. The river has historically provided the principal navigational access for Alabama. Since construction of the Tennessee-Tombigbee Waterway, it also provides an alternative route into the Ohio River watershed.

The combined stream flows south, in a winding course. The Mobile River flows through the Mobile-Tensaw River Delta and reaches Mobile Bay on the Gulf of Mexico just east of downtown Mobile.

Biodiversity 
The Mobile River Basin historically supported the greatest biodiversity of freshwater snail species in the world (Bogan et al. 1995), including six genera and over 100 species that were endemic to the Mobile River Basin. During the past few decades, publications in the scientific literature have primarily dealt with the apparent decimation of this fauna following the construction of dams within the Mobile River Basin and the inundation of extensive shoal (a shallow place in a body of water) habitats by impounded waters (Goodrich 1944, Athearn 1970, Heard 1970, Stein 1976, Palmer 1986, Garner 1990).

The James M. Barry Electric Generating Plant, owned by Alabama Power, has a leaking unlined Fly ash pit located "on land that lies within a hairpin crook of the Mobile River." For this reason the river has been described as the third most endangered river in the United States.

Crossings
This is a list of bridges and other crossings of the Mobile River from Mobile Bay upstream to its source at the confluence of the Tombigbee and Alabama rivers.  Proposals for a new bridge to carry Interstate 10 over the river have been debated for several years.  Currently the Alabama Department of Transportation is conducting an environmental impact study for such a crossing and into the widening of the Jubilee Parkway, which carries Interstate 10 over Mobile Bay.  The location of this bridge is of great debate with some parties pushing for a crossing south of the current tunnels while others are opposed to anything south of the Cochrane–Africatown USA Bridge.

Gallery

See also
Mobile-Tensaw River Delta
Alabama River
Tombigbee River
List of Alabama rivers
 South Atlantic-Gulf Water Resource Region

References

External links

USGS: Mobile River Basin
University of Alabama: Mobile River System
Mobile River Terminal

 
Rivers of Mobile County, Alabama
Rivers of Baldwin County, Alabama
Tributaries of Mobile Bay
Rivers of Alabama
Alabama placenames of Native American origin